The voiced palato-alveolar sibilant affricate, voiced post-alveolar affricate or voiced domed postalveolar sibilant affricate, is a type of consonantal sound, used in some spoken languages. For Albanian speakers, the sound is close to the expressed by the diagraph Xh.

Features
Features of the voiced postalveolar affricate:

Occurrence

Voiced postalveolar non-sibilant affricate

Features

 Its place of articulation is postalveolar, which means it is articulated with either the tip or the blade of the tongue behind the alveolar ridge.

Occurrence

See also
 Index of phonetics articles

Notes

References

External links
 

Postalveolar consonants
Affricates
Pulmonic consonants
Voiced oral consonants
Central consonants